Metallostichodes is a genus of snout moths.

Species
 Metallostichodes bicolorella (Heinemann, 1864)
 Metallostichodes nigrocyanella (Constant, 1865)
 Metallostichodes povolnyi Roesler, 1983
 Metallostichodes vinaceella (Ragonot, 1895)

References

Phycitini
Pyralidae genera